Chambardia is a genus of bivalves belonging to the family Iridinidae.

The species of this genus are found in Africa.

Species:

Chambardia bourguignati 
Chambardia feibeli 
Chambardia flava 
Chambardia letourneuxi 
Chambardia letourneuxi 
Chambardia moutai 
Chambardia nyassaensis 
Chambardia petersi 
Chambardia rubens 
Chambardia struckmanni 
Chambardia trapezia 
Chambardia triangulata 
Chambardia wahlbergi 
Chambardia welwitschii 
Chambardia wissmanni

References

Unionida
Bivalve genera